Petra Vela de Vidal Kenedy (31 January 1823 – 16 March 1885) was a Mexican rancher, philanthropist, and matriarch of one of the most influential families in South Texas during the nineteenth century.

Early life 
Petra Vela was born on 31 January 1823, to Gregorio and Josefa Vela in Mier, Mexico. Her father was a Spanish governor who oversaw the territory between the Rio Grande and Nueces Rivers. Being one of seventeen children, she grew up in a very religious and patriotic household.

Career and marriages 
Petra’s first marriage was to Luis Vidal, a Greek colonel in the Mexican Regular Army, the exact date of which is unknown. Luis’ decorated military career allowed him and Petra to become a very wealthy family and allowed Petra to establish military contacts within the Mexican military. Luis Vidal died in 1849 of cholera whereupon Petra inherited much of Luis’ wealth. This added to the wealth she had inherited from her father’s estate in 1846, making Petra a very wealthy woman for this time.

Following her first husband’s death, Petra decided to take her children and move to Brownsville, Texas. There she met Mifflin Kenedy, a rancher, and the two were married in 1852. Over the next several years, Petra and Mifflin had six more children and adopted another child. In 1854, Petra and Mifflin purchased 10,000 sheep and would grow their influence over the next several years, despite frontier raids becoming common place.

The Kenedys became one of the wealthiest families in South Texas, dealing primarily in cattle, horses, sheep and land. Mifflin Kenedy was partners with Richard King in the King Ranch until 1868. The following year, he purchased the Laureles Ranch near Corpus Christi, and the family moved there. The ranch consisted of 172,000 acres and employed 161 people. Petra Kenedy managed the servants.  Petra was able to use her connections to persuade raiders not to raid her ranch and she used her wealth to fund a small army of mercenaries to protect her interest.

Later life 
During Petra’s later years, she donated much of her acquired wealth to Catholic institutions all over South Texas. She made many donations to St. Mary’s Catholic church in Brownsville, Texas. She died on 16 March 1885 and was buried in Brownsville, Texas.

References 

19th-century Mexican businesswomen
Ranchers
People from Tamaulipas
1823 births
1885 deaths